Franz Josef Gießibl (born 27 May 1962 in Amerang) is a German physicist and university professor at the University of Regensburg.

Life 
Giessibl studied physics from 1982 to 1987 at the Technical University of Munich and at Eidgenössische Technischen Hochschule Zürich. He received a diploma in experimental physics in 1988 with Professor Gerhard Abstreiter and continued with a PhD in physics with Nobel Laureate Gerd Binnig at the IBM Physics Group Munich on atomic force microscopy. After submitting his PhD thesis in the end of 1991, he continued for 6 months as a Postdoctoral Fellow at the IBM Physics Group Munich and moved to Silicon Valley to join Park Scientific Instruments, Inc as a senior scientist and later director of vacuum products from mid 1992 until the end of 1994. He joined the Munich office of management consulting firm McKinsey & Company from 1995 to 1996 as a senior associate. During that time, he invented the qPlus sensor, a new probe for atomic force microscopy and continued experimental and theoretical work on the force microscope at the chair of Professor Jochen Mannhart at University of Augsburg where he received a habilitation in 2001.

In 2005, he obtained offers for a chair at the University of Bristol (England) and University of Regensburg (Germany). In 2006, he joined the faculty at the Department of Physics at the University of Regensburg in Germany. From about 2005, he collaborated with the scanning tunneling microscopy groups of IBM Almaden Research Center and IBM Zurich Research Laboratory and from about 2010 with National Institute of Standards and Technology to help to establish combined scanning tunneling microscopy and atomic force microscopy at ultralow temperatures. He was a visiting fellow at the center for nanoscience and technology (CNST) of the National Institute of Standards and Technology and a visiting professor at University of Maryland, College Park from fall 2015 to spring 2016.

Some of Giessibl's experimental and simulated images inspired the offset print editions Erster Blick (2000)  and Graphit (2004) by visual artist Gerhard Richter.

Franz Giessibl is married and has two sons.

Scientific contributions 
Giessibl established atomic force microscopy as a surface science tool with atomic resolution, launching the field of Non-contact atomic force microscopy. Together with his team, he even obtained subatomic spatial resolution (F.J. Giessibl, S. Hembacher, H. Bielefeldt, J. Mannhart, Science 2000), and published papers on ground breaking experiments, instrumentation
and theoretical foundations
of atomic force microscopy. 
Giessibl is the inventor of the  qPlus sensor, a sensor for Non-contact atomic force microscopy that relies on a quartz cantilever. His invention has enabled atomic force microscopy to obtain subatomic spatial resolution on individual atoms and submolecular resolution on organic molecules. Today, the qPlus sensor is used in more than 500 commercial and homebuilt atomic force microscopes around the world.

 1992: Built the first low-temperature force microscope for ultrahigh vacuum with Gerd Binnig (PhD adviser) and Christoph Gerber (F.J. Giessibl, C. Gerber, G. Binnig, Journal of Vacuum Science and Technology B 1991 and obtained atomic resolution on KBr with it (F.J. Giessibl, G. Binnig, Ultramicroscopy 1992)]. KBr has a very low reactivity, yet major challenges such as jump-to-contact of AFM tip and sample had to be overcome to obtain atomic resolution.  
 1992: Proposed a mechanism allowing atomic resolution in noncontact-AFM Phys Rev B 1992).
 1994: Solved the problem of imaging reactive samples and obtained for the first time atomic resolution on Silicon 7x7 by force microscopy using frequency-modulation atomic force microscopy in noncontact mode with large amplitudes (Science 1995).
 1996: Invented the qPlus sensor, a self sensing AFM quartz sensor that is self sensing (piezoelectric effect), highly stable in frequency and stiff enough to allow sub-Angstrom oscillation amplitudes (Patents DE19633546, US6240771, Appl. Phys. Lett. 1998).
 1997: Introduces a formula that connects frequency shifts and forces for large amplitudes (Phys Rev B 1997).
 2000: Obtains atomic spatial resolution using qPlus sensor (Appl. Phys. Lett. 2000).
 2000: Observes subatomic resolution on tip features (F.J. Giessibl, S. Hembacher, H. Bielefeldt, J. Mannhart, Science 2000).
 2001: Invents an algorithm to deconvolute forces from frequency shifts (Appl Phys Lett 2001.).
 2003: Extended version of his habilitation thesis is published in Reviews of Modern Physics (RMP 2003).
 2003: Obtaines atomically resolved lateral force microscopy (F.J. Giessibl, M. Herz, J. Mannhart, PNAS 2003).
 2004: Achieves sub-Angstrom resolution on tip features using a qPlus sensor in a low temperature AFM using higher harmonic force microscopy (S. Hembacher, F.J. Giessibl, J. Mannhart, Science 2004).
 2005–2008: Helps to spread out qPlus sensor technology to IBM Research Laboratories Almaden and Rüschlikon, leading to measurements of forces that act during atomic manipulation (M. Ternes, C.P. Lutz, C. Hirjibehedin, F.J. Giessibl, A. Heinrich, Science 2008) and single-electron charges on single gold atoms (Science 2009).
 2012: Introduces carbon monoxide front atom identification (COFI), a method for the atomic and subatomic characterization of scanning probe tips (J. Welker, F.J. Giessibl, Science 2012).
 2013: Observes evidence for superexchange interaction and very low noise data of exchange interactions between CoSm tips and antiferromagnetic NiO (F. Pielmeier, F.J. Giessibl, Phys. Rev. Lett. 2013).
 2013: Observes atomic resolution in ambient conditions without special sample preparation (D. Wastl, A.J. Weymouth, F.J. Giessibl, Phys. Rev. B 2013).
 2014: Measurement of CO-CO interactions by lateral force microscopy (A.J. Weymouth, T. Hofmann, F.J. Giessibl, Science 2014).
 2015: Atomic resolution of few atom metal clusters and subatomic resolution of single metal atoms (M. Emmrich et al., Science 2015).
 2016: Simultaneous inelastic tunneling spectroscopy and AFM (N. Okabayashi et al., Phys. Rev. B 2016), AFM with superconductive tips (A. Peronio, F.J. Giessibl, Phys. Rev. B 2016), Multifrequency AFM using bimodal qPlus sensors (H. Ooe et al., Appl Phys Lett 2016).
 2018: Simultaneous inelastic tunneling spectroscopy and AFM shows bond weakening effect (N. Okabayashi et al., PNAS 2018).
 2018: Joint study with John Sader group on well- and ill posed force deconvolution schemes (J. Sader, B. Hughes, F. Huber, F.J. Giessibl, Nature Nanotechnology 2018).
 2019: Review article about qPlus sensors and applications (Review of Scientific Instruments 2019).
 2021: Measurement of very weak bonds to artificial atoms formed by quantum corrals ( https://doi.org/10.1126/science.abe2600 Science 2021'').

Selected publications

Books 
1. Noncontact Atomic Force Microscopy: Volume II (NanoScience and Technology), S. Morita, F.J. Giessibl, R. Wiesendanger (Eds.), Springer 2012

2. Noncontact Atomic Force Microscopy: Volume III (NanoScience and Technology), S. Morita, F.J. Giessibl, E. Meyer, R. Wiesendanger (Eds.), Springer 2015

3. Erster Blick in das Innere eines Atoms – Begegnungen mit Gerhard Richter zwischen Kunst und Wissenschaft, Franz J. Gießibl, Verlag der Buchhandlung Walther und Franz König, Köln, Germany (2022)

4. First View inside an Atom― Encounters with Gerhard Richter between Art and Science, English Edition, Franz J. Gießibl, Verlag der Buchhandlung Walther und Franz König, Köln, Germany (2022)

Awards and honors

 1994: R&D 100 Award (together with Brian Trafas)
 2000: Deutscher Nanowissenschaftspreis
 2001: Rudolf-Kaiser-Preis
 2009: Karl Heinz Beckurts-Preis
 2010: Ehrenfest Kolloquium Leiden (27 Oct 2010) (Netherlands)
 2013: Zernike Kolloquium Groningen (Netherlands)
 2014: Joseph F. Keithley Award For Advances in Measurement Science of the American Physical Society
 2015: Rudolf-Jaeckel Prize of the German Vacuum Society
 2016: Foresight Institute Feynman Prize in Nanotechnology

References

External links
 
 Mark Wendman nanoscience blog

Academic staff of the University of Regensburg
21st-century German physicists
21st-century German inventors
Technical University of Munich alumni
1962 births
Living people
Microscopists
People from Rosenheim (district)